Ken McIntyre may refer to: 
Kenneth McIntyre, Australian lawyer and historian
Makanda Ken McIntyre, American jazz musician and composer